Nikos Zouglis (born 14 November 2003) is a Greek professional footballer who plays as a midfielder for Super League club Asteras Tripolis.

References

2003 births
Living people
Greek footballers
Super League Greece players
Asteras Tripolis F.C. players
Association football midfielders
Footballers from Argos, Peloponnese